Dalbergia peltieri is a species of legume in the family Fabaceae.
It is found only in Madagascar.
It is threatened by habitat loss.

References

peltieri
Endemic flora of Madagascar
Near threatened plants
Taxonomy articles created by Polbot